Nel Martin is a Spanish professional vert skater. Nel started skating in 1994 and earned a Bronze medal at the X Games in Los Angeles in 2003 and a Silver medal at the FISE contest in France in 2003.

Best Trick Double Backflip, Double Flatspin 540, Fakie 1080

Vert Competitions 
2008 Asian X Games, Shanghai - Vert: 5th
2006 LG Action Sports World Tour, Paris, France - Vert: 6th
2006 LG Action Sports World Tour, Berlin, Germany - Vert: 9th
2006 LG Action Sports World Tour, Birmingham, England - Vert: 5th
2005 LG Action Sports Tour, Moscow, Russia - Vert: 4th
2005 LG Action Sports Tour, Munich, Germany - Vert: 10th
2004 ASA Pro Tour Year-End Ranking (Vert): 17th
2004 LG Action Sports Asian Tour, Shanghai, China: 6th
2004 LG Action Sports Asian Tour, Beijing, China: 7th
2004 LG Action Sports Asian Tour, Seoul, Korea: 5th
2004 X Games - Vert: 11th
2003 LG Action Sports Championships - Vert: 4th
2003 X Games - Vert: Bronze Medalist
2003 FISE, Montpellier, France - Vert: 2nd
2002 ESPN X Games - Vert: 7th
2002 European X Games - Vert: 4th
2002 Gravity Games - Vert: 5th
2002 ASA Pro Tour, Milwaukee, WI - Vert: 9th
2001 Gravity Games - Vert: 7th
2001 ASA Pro Tour - Rome, Italy: 4th

References

External links
grindtv.com
nelmartin.com
asaentertainment.com
espneventmedia.com
espneventmedia.com
rollernews.com
rollernews.com
skatelog.com
skatelog.com
skatelog.com
skatelog.com
skatelog.com
skatelog.com

1980 births
Living people
Vert skaters
X Games athletes